Tobia Masini (born 8 December 1976 in Poggibonsi) is an Italian auto racing driver.

Career
He spent some time racing in the United Kingdom, finishing as runner-up in the 1999 Renault Spider Championship behind Andy Priaulx. He went on to compete in the European Touring Car Championship with a Super Production Alfa Romeo 156. In 2005 he was champion of the Italian Superstars Series driving an Audi RS6.

External links

1976 births
Living people
People from Poggibonsi
Italian racing drivers
European Touring Car Championship drivers
Sportspeople from the Province of Siena
Footballers from Tuscany